Lois Delmore (born 1949) is an American politician. She is a member of the North Dakota House of Representatives from the 43rd District, serving since 1994. She is a member of the Democratic-NPL party.

References

1949 births
Living people
Women state legislators in North Dakota
21st-century American politicians
21st-century American women politicians
Democratic Party members of the North Dakota House of Representatives